Lifetime: The Collection is a compilation album by The New Tony Williams Lifetime, released in 1992 on Columbia/Legacy Records. The album contains all of the music from the two original New Lifetime albums Believe It (1975) and Million Dollar Legs (1976).

Reception
Allmusic awarded the album with 4.5 stars and its review by Scott Yanow states: "Although not flawless (some of the music has dated), these long-overlooked performances are worth exploring by fusion collectors, especially for Holdsworth's fiery yet thoughtful solos".

Track listing
 "Snake Oil" (Tony Newton) — 6:30
 "Fred" (Allan Holdsworth) — 6:48
 "Proto-Cosmos" (Alan Pasqua) — 4:02
 "Red Alert" (Newton) — 4:39
 "Wildlife" (Tony Williams) — 5:22
 "Mr Spock" (Holdsworth) — 6:15
 "Sweet Revenge" (Williams) — 6:03
 "You Did It to Me Baby" (Williams, Al Cleveland) — 3:45
 "Million Dollar Legs" (Williams) — 6:38
 "Joy Filled Summer" (Newton) — 5:50
 "Lady Jane" (Pasqua) — 3:56
 "What You Do to Me" (Williams) — 6:38
 "Inspirations of Love" (Newton) — 9:48

Personnel
Allan Holdsworth – guitar
Alan Pasqua – keyboards
Tony Newton – bass, vocals
Tony Williams – drums

References

The Tony Williams Lifetime albums
1992 compilation albums
Albums produced by Bruce Botnick